Herod Archelaus (Hērōidēs Archelaos; 23 BC – ) was the ethnarch of Samaria, Judea, and Idumea, including the cities Caesarea and Jaffa, for nine years. He was the son of Herod the Great and Malthace the Samaritan, brother of Herod Antipas, and half-brother of Herod II. Archelaus (a name meaning "leading the people") came to power after the death of his father Herod the Great in 4 BC, and ruled over one-half of the territorial dominion of his father. Archelaus was removed by the Roman emperor Augustus when Judaea province was formed under direct Roman rule, at the time of the Census of Quirinius.

Biography 

Josephus writes that Herod the Great (father of Archelaus) was in Jericho at the time of his death. Just prior to his final trip to Jericho, he was deeply involved in a religious conflagration. Herod had placed a golden eagle over the Temple entrance which was perceived as blasphemous. The eagle was chopped down with axes. Two teachers and approximately 40 other youths were arrested for this act and immolated. Herod defended his works and offered an attack on his predecessors, the dynastic Hasmoneans. Herod killed all male lineal successors of the Hasmoneans. The Pharisees had long attacked the Hasmoneans as well, as having parentage from Greeks while under bondage. This racial slur was repeated by the Pharisees through the rule of Alexander Jannaeus and Queen Salome.

With this explicit background given, Josephus began an exposition of the days of Archelaus' reign before Passover of 4 BC. Archelaus dressed in white and ascended a golden throne and appeared to be kind to the populace in Jerusalem in order to appease their desires for lower taxes and an end to the (political) imprisonment of Herod's enemies. The demeanor of the questioning appeared to turn at some point, and the crowd began to call for the punishment of those of Herod's people who ordered the death of the two teachers and the 40 youths.  They also demanded the replacement of the High Priest, from the appointed High Priest of Herod's to a High Priest, "of greater piety and purity". Josephus does not tell who would be "of greater piety and purity". To this request, however, Archelaus acceded, although he was becoming angry at the presumptions of the crowds. Archelaus asked for moderation and told the crowds that all would be well if they would put aside their animosities and wait until he was confirmed king by Caesar Augustus.

Archelaus then left to feast with his friends. It was evening and as the darkness settled, a mourning and wailing began over the city. Archelaus began to worry as people begin streaming into the temple area and those who wailed for the loss of the teachers continued their very loud mourning. The people were escalating in their threatening behavior. Henry St. John Thackeray's translation of Josephus here states it thus: "The promoters of the mourning for the doctors stood in the body of the temple, procuring recruits for their faction". Josephus does not tell us who these "promoters of the mourning", who recruit from within a body inside the Temple, could have been.

Archelaus then sent a general, some other people, and finally a "tribune in Command of a Cohort" to reason with these "Seditionists", to stop their "innovations" and wait until Archelaus could return from Rome and Caesar. Those who came from Archelaus were stoned, with many killed. After the stoning, those who stoned the soldiers returned to their sacrifices, as if nothing had happened.  Josephus does not tell who performed the sacrifices in the Temple. It was after midnight, and Archelaus suddenly ordered the entire army into the city to the temple. Josephus records the death toll at 3000. Archelaus sent heralds around the city announcing the cancellation of Passover.

Archelaus quickly sailed to Caesar and faced a group of enemies – his own family. Antipas, the younger brother of Archelaus who was deposed from Herod's will days earlier, argued that Archelaus merely feigned grief for his father, crying during the day and involved with great "merriment" during the night. The threats carried out by Archelaus ending in the death of 3000 in the Temple were not just threats to the worshipers in Jerusalem at Passover, but also amounted to a threat to Caesar himself, since Archelaus acted in every manner a king, before such title had been given by Caesar.

At this point, Nicolaus of Damascus argued to Caesar that Archelaus acted appropriately and that Herod's will, supposedly written a few weeks prior (yielding the kingship to Archelaus and against Antipater), should be seen as valid. The change of this will in favor of Archelaus is given as Herod's true choice and, it is argued, occurred with Herod being in his right mind since he left the final decision to Caesar. The change of the will appears as one of Herod's last acts and it is attested from Jericho by one "Ptolemy", keeper of Herod's Seal. Nicholaus of Damascus had been Herod's confidant for years. He was loyal to Rome. Ptolemy was Nicholaus of Damascus' brother.

Archelaus, at the conclusion of the arguments, fell at Caesar's feet. Caesar raised him up and stated that Archelaus "was worthy to succeed his father". Caesar gave Archelaus the title of ethnarch and divided the kingdom. Rome would consolidate its power later.

Thus, Archelaus received the tetrarchy of Judea through the last will of his father, though a previous will had bequeathed it to his brother Antipas. He was proclaimed king by the army, but declined to assume the title until he had submitted his claims to Caesar Augustus in Rome. In Rome he was opposed by Antipas and by many of the Jews, who feared his cruelty, based on the murder of 3000; but in 4 BC Augustus allotted to him the greater part of the kingdom (Samaria, Judea, and Idumea) with the title of ethnarch (a ruler of an ethnic group).

The first wife of Archelaus is given by Josephus simply as Mariamne, perhaps Mariamne III, daughter of Aristobulus IV, whom he divorced to marry Glaphyra. She was the widow of Archelaus' brother Alexander, though her second husband, Juba, king of Mauretania, was alive. This violation of the Mosaic law, along with Archelaus' continued cruelty, roused the ire of the Jews, who complained to Augustus. Archelaus fell into disrepute and was deposed in his 10th year of reign as ethnarch, being banished to Vienna (today Vienne) in Gaul. Samaria, Judea proper, and Idumea became the Roman province of Judaea.

Biblical references

Archelaus is mentioned in the Gospel of Matthew (chapter 2 verse 13–23). An angel of the Lord appeared to Joseph in a dream and told him to get up and take Mary and Jesus and flee to Egypt to avoid the Massacre of the Innocents. When Herod the Great died, Joseph was told by an angel in a dream to return to the land of Israel (presumably to Bethlehem). However, upon hearing that Archelaus had succeeded his father as ruler of Judaea he "was afraid to go there" (Matthew 2:22), and was again warned in a dream by God "and turned aside to the region of" Galilee. This is Matthew's explanation of why Jesus was born in Bethlehem in Judea but grew up in Nazareth.

The beginning and conclusion of Jesus' parable of the minas in the Gospel of Luke, chapter 19, may refer to Archelaus' journey to Rome. Some interpreters conclude from this that Jesus' parables and preaching made use of events familiar to the people as examples for bringing his spiritual lessons to life. Others read the allusion as arising from later adaptations of Jesus' parables in the oral tradition, before the parables were recorded in the gospels.
A nobleman went into a far country to receive for himself a kingdom and then return ... But his citizens hated him and sent a delegation after him, saying, "We do not want this man to reign over us." ... "But as for these enemies of mine," [said the nobleman,] "who did not want me to reign over them, bring them here and slaughter them before me."

See also 
 Herodian dynasty
 Herodian kingdom
 List of biblical figures identified in extra-biblical sources

References

External links

ARCHELAUS by Abraham Schalit. Encyclopaedia Judaica article at Encyclopedia.com
Herod Archelaus at Livius.org
Archelaus by Richard Gottheil and Louis Ginzberg at The Jewish Encyclopedia

23 BC births
18 deaths
1st-century BC Herodian rulers
1st-century Herodian rulers
Jews and Judaism in the Roman Empire
Herodian dynasty
People in the canonical gospels
1st-century BC rulers in Asia
Roman client rulers
Jewish royalty
1st-century monarchs in the Middle East
Herod the Great
Judea (Roman province)
1st-century BCE Jews
1st-century Jews
Census of Quirinius